Estera Dobre (born February 10, 1987 in Râmnicu Vâlcea) is an amateur Romanian wrestler, who competed in the women's flyweight category. Between 2009 and 2012, Dobre won a total of four silver medals for the 48 and 51 kg classes at the European Wrestling Championships. She was disqualified from the 2013 European Wrestling Championships on a positive doping sample and given a two-year ban. She is also a member of CSA Steaua Bucuresti, and is coached and trained by Arpad Matefi.

Dobre represented Romania at the 2008 Summer Olympics in Beijing, where she competed for the women's 48 kg class. She received a bye for the second preliminary round, before losing out to El Salvador's Íngrid Medrano, with a technical score of 8–12.

References

External links
Profile – International Wrestling Database
NBC Olympics Profile

Romanian female sport wrestlers
1987 births
Living people
Olympic wrestlers of Romania
Wrestlers at the 2008 Summer Olympics
Sportspeople from Râmnicu Vâlcea
Doping cases in wrestling
Romanian sportspeople in doping cases
Wrestlers at the 2015 European Games
European Games competitors for Romania
20th-century Romanian women
21st-century Romanian women